"Wasn't Me" is a song performed by Spanish singer/songwriter Barei. The song was released in Spain as a digital download on 23 June 2017. The song peaked at number 32 on the Spanish Singles Chart.

Background
On 19 June 2017, Barei announced on Twitter that she was bringing out three new songs with different themes. "Wasn't Me" was released in Spain as a digital download on 23 June 2017. It was the first of three song to be released by Barei week-on-week, "Forget It" would be released on 30 June 2017, and "Worry, Worry" released on 7 July 2017.

Lyric video
A lyric video to accompany the release of "Wasn't Me" was first released onto YouTube on 23 June 2017 at a total length of three minutes and fourteen seconds.

Track listing

Charts

Release history

References

2017 songs
2017 singles